Siddharth Menon (born 19 May 1989) is an Indian film, television and theatre actor. He is best known for his roles in  Loev (2015), Rajwade and Sons (2015) and Karwaan (2018).

Early life
Menon was born to Malayali parents. He was brought up in Pune. He was a student of Gurukul School in Bhosalenagar. He graduated from Brihan Maharashtra College of Commerce in 2010, with a Bachelor of Commerce degree. He initially worked with a group called Askata, before starting Natak Company.

Personal life

He studied in the Gurukul School in Bhoslenagar, Pune. His love for acting began when his parents took him to the movies as a child. He is of Malayali origin. He married Poornima Nair on 3 February 2016 in Kerala.

Career 
He was one of the founding members of the Pune-based theatre troupe, Natak Company, in 2008. He started out in theatre and eventually rose to fame through the crime-thriller, Peddlers(2012). He was also seen in Junglenama, a play directed by Sarang Sathaye. He made his Marathi debut through Ekulti Ek(2012). In 2015, he was in a movie called Loev. He also had a stint as a celebrity radio jockey. In 2018, he has played the titular character during the Indian run of the Broadway musical Aladdin, for which he had to undergo physical training. The actor is currently based in Mumbai. He can also do Calisthenics. He was also seen playing Saket in A Doubtful Gaze at Uber at Midnight, a play which was staged at Serendipity Arts Festival 2018, in Goa. It was directed by Alok Rajwade.

Media image

Filmography

References

External links 
 

21st-century Indian male actors
Living people
1989 births
Indian male television actors
Indian male stage actors
Indian male film actors
Male actors in Hindi cinema
Male actors in Marathi theatre
Male actors in Marathi cinema
Malayali people